The Iveco MyWay (later known as Irisbus MyWay) is a class of buses produced by Iveco and then by Irisbus, from 1999 to 2007.

MyWay is a bus for extraurban routes. The MyWay had 55 or 53 seats, depending from the type of the central door.

The MyWay was replaced by the new Irisbus models Arway and Crossway in 2007.

See also 
 List of buses

MyWay
Vehicles introduced in 1999